Brother to Brother may refer to:

 Brother to Brother (film), a 2004 film written and directed by Rodney Evans
 Brother to Brother (Dave Burrell and David Murray album), 1993
 Brother to Brother (Gino Vannelli album)
 Brother to Brother, Tinga Stewart album